Deerbrook may refer to:

United States
Deerbrook, Mississippi, an unincorporated community in Noxubee County
Deerbrook, Wisconsin, an unincorporated community located in Langlade County
Deerbrook Mall (Chicago), a shopping mall in Deerfield, Illinois
Deerbrook Mall (Houston), a shopping mall in Humble, Texas